Harold D. Cagle (July 23, 1936 – November 27, 2015) was an American football player and coach. He served as the head football coach at Missouri Western State University in St. Joseph, Missouri from 1970 to 1973. He served as the program's first head coach at Missouri Western.

References

1936 births
2015 deaths
American football quarterbacks
Central Missouri Mules football coaches
Missouri Western Griffons football coaches
Northeastern State RiverHawks football players
High school football coaches in Kansas
High school football coaches in Oklahoma
Junior college football coaches in the United States
People from Tulsa County, Oklahoma
Players of American football from Oklahoma